
Year 498 (CDXCVIII) was a common year starting on Thursday (link will display the full calendar) of the Julian calendar. At the time, it was known as the Year of the Consulship of Paulinus and Scytha (or, less frequently, year 1251 Ab urbe condita). The denomination 498 for this year has been used since the early medieval period, when the Anno Domini calendar era became the prevalent method in Europe for naming years.

Events 
 By place 
 Byzantine Empire 
 Emperor Anastasius I abolishes the chrysargyron tax throughout the Eastern Roman Empire, before reforming the monetary system, using Greek numerals instead of Roman.

 Persia 
 Kavadh I returns from exile with support of 30,000 Hephthalites (White Huns), and again assumes the Sassanid throne. He punishes his opponents and probably his brother Djamasp, who usurped the throne from him.

 Japan 
 Prince Buretsu, age 9, succeeds his father Ninken and becomes the 25th emperor.

 By topic 
 Religion 
 November 19 – Pope Anastasius II dies after a 2-year reign in which he has tried to conciliate followers of Acacius, late patriarch of Constantinople, who was excommunicated by Felix III.
 November 22 – Anastasius is succeeded by Symmachus as the 51st pope, in the official papal selection in the Lateran Palace (Rome). Meanwhile, Antipope Laurentius is elected "pope" in the Basilica di Santa Maria Maggiore, causing a schism.
 Flavian II succeeds Palladius as patriarch of Antioch.

Births 
 Jie Min Di, emperor of Northern Wei (d. 532)
 Kevin of Glendalough, Irish abbot and saint (d. 618)

Deaths 
 November 19 – Pope Anastasius II
 Ninken, emperor of Japan
 Qi Mingdi, emperor of Southern Qi (b. 452)

References